Joachim-Yehoyachin Stutschewsky, (7 February 1891 – 14 November 1982) was a Ukraine-born Austrian and Israeli cellist, composer, musicologist.

Biography
Joachim-Yehoyachin Stutschewsky was born on 7 February 1891 in Romni, guberniya of Poltava, Ukraine, in a family of klezmer musicians. His father, Kalmen-Leyb Stutschewsky was a clarinetist. Stutschewsky started playing the violin at the age of five but soon started playing the cello. He studied at the Royal Conservatory of Music of Leipzig from 1909 to 1912.

He returned to Russia, but soon after, he was smuggled across the border to avoid forced conscription. He then tried to earn his livelihood for a short period of time as a cellist, In Paris and Jena.

He moved to Vienna in 1924 where he joined the Kolisch Quartet. He was spending a lot of time studying Jewish folklore and wrote several musical pieces. He moved to Palestine in 1938.

Throughout his life he was collecting examples of Jewish folklore, especially hasidic melodies. He has written multiple musical pieces for cello and piano. He has also adapted numerous piano pieces for the cello.

Stutschewsky was married twice. His first wife was the Swiss cellist Rewekka (Regina) "Wecki" Schein (1908 - 1999).

Stutschewsky died in Tel Aviv, Israel'. His archive can be found in the Felicja Blumental music library there. הספרייה במרכז פליציה בלומנטל למוזיקה

References

External links
 

1891 births
1982 deaths
20th-century classical composers
20th-century Austrian musicologists
Austrian classical cellists
Austrian classical composers
Austrian emigrants to Mandatory Palestine
Austrian male classical composers
Israeli classical cellists
Israeli composers
Israeli musicologists
Jewish classical composers
Jewish emigrants from Austria to Mandatory Palestine after the Anschluss
People from Romny
People from Tel Aviv
Ukrainian classical cellists
Ukrainian classical composers
Ukrainian Jews
20th-century cellists